Li Guangwen (Chinese: 李光文; Pinyin: Lǐ Guāngwén; , born 20 June 1992), previously known as Li Guang (Chinese: 李光), is a Chinese football player of Korean descent who currently plays for Changchun Yatai in the Chinese Super League.

Club career
Li started his professional football career in 2011 when he was promoted to Chinese Super League side Changchun Yatai's first team. He did not appear for Changchun in the 2011 league season. On 10 August 2012, he made his senior debut in a 0–0 away draw against Guizhou Renhe, coming on as a substitute for Wang Dong in the 72nd minute. Li made 4 league appearances in the 2012 season.

Personal life
Li Guang's twin younger brother Li Shangwen is also a professional footballer. They played together in Changchun Yatai.

Career statistics
Statistics accurate as of match played 31 December 2020.

Honours

Club
Changchun Yatai
 China League One: 2020

References

External links
 

Living people
1992 births
People from Yanbian
Chinese footballers
Footballers from Jilin
Changchun Yatai F.C. players
Yunnan Flying Tigers F.C. players
Association football midfielders
Chinese people of Korean descent
Chinese Super League players
China League One players
China League Two players
Twin sportspeople
Chinese twins